Plain Truth is a pamphlet authored by the loyalist James Chalmers in 1776, as a rebuke of Thomas Paine's Common Sense.

Chalmers used the pen name "Candidus."
The pamphlet that James Chalmer wrote as a rebuke of author Thomas Paines' book 'Common Sense' stated that Thomas Paines' complaints about the British Monarchy were 'invalid' and 'barbaric'.

References

External links
 An abridged edition of the March 1776 pamphlet written as a response to Thomas Paine's Common Sense.

Pamphlets
1776 non-fiction books
American political philosophy literature
Documents of the American Revolution